is a Japanese football player. He plays for MIO Biwako Shiga.

Club statistics

References

External links

1987 births
Living people
Association football people from Ibaraki Prefecture
Japanese footballers
J1 League players
J2 League players
Japan Football League players
Kashiwa Reysol players
Sagan Tosu players
Azul Claro Numazu players
MIO Biwako Shiga players
Association football midfielders